Oron Nation had existed as a free sovereign and egalitarian society for hundreds of years before it was forcibly incorporated into the amalgamated Nigeria in 1914. Oron people share a strong ancestral lineage with the Efik people in Cross River State; Uruan, Ibeno, Andoni people (the Obolo) both in Akwa Ibom State and in Rivers State, along with the Balondo-ba-Konja now in Congo. The Oron people (Örö) are a major ethnic group present today in Akwa Ibom State, Nigeria.

History 

By 1200 CE (12 Century) the free sovereign and egalitarian society of the Oron people which is made up of six ethnic tribal groups have already been settled on the mouth of the Cross River Basin Oyono, but was ruled by Tribal chiefs.

In the late 1200s a legendary hunter, AHTA AYA-ARAH. He was a great hunter native to Eweme, the ancestral home of Oro Ukpabang. During a perilous time of hunger in the middle ages, AHTA AYA-ARAH, went out on his usual safari, but failed to return home same day as should have been. The following day, the community met and set up a search party for a rescue, but all to no avail. One day led to one week, one month passed by, AHTA AYA-ARAH, remained unfound.

Thereafter, a burial was done, believing that AHTA was dead, but surprisingly, two months after his missing, AHTA AYA-ARAH reappeared with species of sweet yams known in Oro today, as NYIN-ENI. When asked where he was, he said “Ku ntak mbiong ku isong, nkuka Abasi idide NYIN-ENI idi unadid”, meaning “Because of hunger in the land, I went to God to collect this yam for mankind”. This is how Oro ended up with the axiom that “AHTA AYA-ARAH ekedeh NYIN-ENI Ku ABASI odi Oro – AHTA AYA-ARAH brought Sweet yams from God to Oro". This feat, earned AHTA AYA-ARAH, the Oro kingship in the late 1200s, such that the Royal Stool, the contemporary AHTA-ORO sits today, is the same Stool AHTA AYA-ARAH sat in the medieval age. This well calved wooden Stool, remains the oldest surviving artifact of Oro and in the Lower Cross River Basin.

This legendary hunter brought the six groups that made up the Oron Nation together by introducing this yam to the different clan who visited him daily with his influence reaching the Cameroons. The group includes
Oron Ukpabang group
Okobo group
Idua (Asang) group
Enwang group
Ebughu Otong group 
Efiat/Mbo group
Since then till date the people recognise themselves as Akpakip Oro (Oron Nation).
The kingdom prospered as an independent unit with a rotatory system of rulership among the different clans head according to oldest Offong or Ovong (Clan head or King).

In the late 1800s (19th Century), Portuguese Traders named the Oron region as Tom shotts Town, The Mbo region as Town shotts Port and the Island between Ibaka Town as Town shotts Island as seen in several ancient Portuguese maps.

In the late 1800s, Portuguese Raiders raid the Oron region pushing several Oron clans hinterland, Which bring about the first shed known as Obio Ufre (An Unforgettable spot) At that same spot, it was therefore agreed that “Ku Oro m’eka ufreh nye-eke Ku ini ifuo ma onung ulid” (Oro clans will rise in alliance to defend their own when attacked by non Oro groups). This is the origin of the coinage *OBIO UFRE – "Idika ufreh oyo-eke" (Never you forget your kinsmen) Subsequently migration from there led to the establishment of several villages.

The kingdom later existed from the late 1800s as a free sovereign and egalitarian society until 1909 when the British raided the region with fire arms and forcefully place the region among the Calabar Unit then Southern Nigeria Protectorate. Around 1914 it was being Amalgamated into Nigeria. In the early 1925 the Akpakip Oro Kingdom revived politically in the reestablishment of the Oron Union and Ahtaship in the region.
Today Ekpu Oro serve as the remains of Oron civilisation and Kingdom.

Secret societies
The most important secret societies of the Oron people are the 'Ekung', 'Ekpe', 'Nka', 'Inam', 'Abang', 'Ukpok', and 'lban Isong'. The last three named are women's society.

Ekpe The Ancient Oron original way of ruling the villages was through Isong before the advent of Ekpe which later became popular and important. In Oron level of governing every society was involved, by far the most important of it was the Ekpe, it is important to note that despite the proximity of Oron to the Ibibio people, Ekpo was not known in Oron until the establishment of colonial rule.

There are considerably controversy as of how different Oron groups acquired the Ekpe. The Ukpabang groups claimed to have acquired their Ekpe from Usakadit in the Cameroons and brought it with them as they dispersed meanwhile the Iduas claimed to be the first to got in contact with the Ekpe which was originally owned by the Efut and Usakadit when one man named Nta Nya on a fishing expedition one day met some Efut men at Ube Osukpong in Akpa Edok playing Ekpe. They went into negotiation with them on how to acquire Ekpe. The Okobo acknowledge to acquire their Ekpe from the Efiks of Old Calabar.

Ekpe became the legislative, executive and police system of Oron as every high chief and title owner most be a member of the Ekpe society, which is made up of seven grades in Oron namely Nyamkpe, Nkanda, Usongo, Ekpeyong, Esa, Ibang and Eyamba. Apart from the Nyamkpe there are other two types of Ekpe in Oron namely Obon and Ekpe Uko. The supreme head of the Ekpe was known as Offong Ekpie (Chief of Ekpe) which is authority could not be challenge by any of the member.

Ekung society is a male society which members was distinguish from the Ekpe members by wearing the Iyara (red woolen cap), which was a mark of great honour and distinction in Oron. The society originally celebrate the martial prowess of its members in their old age. All village chiefs and elders were formally members of the Ekung society to enforce law and order in the society through the imposition of fines iki on those who broke community law.

Awan-idit (Ekpri-Akata) was a male society intimately concerned on the moral fibre of the society. They were regarded as spirits, therefore ubiquitous and capable of knowing every scandal committed in the community. The main function of Akata was the detection of antisocial behavior, the popularization of crimes and the ridiculing of culprits into correction. Akata members were famed in their ability to concoct songs to spotlight such of offences like immoral association of sexes, pregnancy without husband, stealing, witchcraft and other crimes supposedly committed in the dark. The Akata was a mouth piece of informing the public about secret happenings in the Village.

Iban-Isong is a female society which played an important role in the maintenance of law and order. Women organisation which was also known and regards as Abang led by their chief Offong Abang, the society exercised unquestionably authority over the affairs of women in each village with the primary intention of protecting the tendency of womanhood at both homes and marketplaces in other to create law and order in the society. With an entertainment of Abang dances women of different age groups perform their dances style in the village occasionally to bring togetherness in the society meanwhile the men in other societies made dry gin (Ufofo) in other to appease the women.

Religion

Education 
Oron People had an Ancient Educational system where individuals were grouped into age group known as (Nka), whereby the young generation grouped in ages were being taught by the older ones through folklore, oral teaching, ancient cravens and through the Nsibidi.

Nka In Oron, every person in the community both male and female was expected to belong to an Nka, except the very young children. This society was set to enforce the norms of the village on its members who were at the grade of a same age. It was a socializing institution which taught members of the society the norms, law and orders in the society and also contribution in the development of the community. In Oron members often refer to themselves as Nda (Oron) and Adami (Okobo), punishment was given by the Nka on any members that disobey the norms and tradition of the society. The Nka are charged in correspondence role in maintaining public sources of water supply, street, market as well as guarding the village. In Okobo the Nka UkparaIsong was charged in cleaning market square, stream and streets. Nka Ufere look after the shrines abd administered oath for accused person of witchcraft, Nka Ndito was charged in the general administration of the village and ensure orders, Nka Eso acted as village guards. Among the Idua, Nka Mkparawa acted as warriors grade charged with responsibility of fighting of treats in the village, Nka Ndito Isong which membership was both for male and female was to enforce unity and development in the village.
Among the Ukpabangs Nka includes, Nka Nlapp (for Youths), Nka Ikponwi ( for elders), Nka Asian, Nka Ime, Nka Afe, Nka Nkwak and Nka Uteghe. Taken together this sets maintain roads, guard villages, constructed bridges and cleaned the markets.

Arts

Culture and traditions

Oron Bill Of Act (1999)

The Bill Of Rights Of the Oron People Unanimously Adopted and Proclaimed By the General and Representative Assembly
of the Oron Indigenous Ethnic Linguistic Nationality, Nigeria,
At the Oron Civic Centre, Oron, Friday,  25 June 1999

Under the Leadership and Guidance of Oron National Forum, (ONAF) Oron Development Union, (ODU) Oron Women Action Group, (OWAG) Oron Youth Movement, (OYOM) Oron Public Relations Committee, (OPRC)
Organised by ORON NATIONAL FORUM (ONAF) 200 Oron Road, Oron.
25 June 1999

ENABLING RESOLUTION

We the proud youths and representatives of Oron people ~
Conscious of our historical role as the custodians of posterity;

Aware of our duties as protectors of our people, culture, civilization, heritage, destiny and rights as a free people and coherent nationality;

Fully informed about the status, experience and the prospects of our people in the Nigerian society;

Do hereby at the Representative Conference in the Oron Metropolis on the 25th day of June, 1999.
Declare as follows:

Whereas the Oron people comprising the five Local Government Areas of Mbo, Udung-Uko, Okobo, Urue Offiong/Oruko and Oron in Akwa Ibom State of Nigeria had existed as an independent, sovereign nation for hundred of years before the formation of Nigeria by the British imperial power; - Whereas the Oron Nation and people were never in any way consulted before they, including their land -were compromised by the British into the Nigeria contraption;

Whereas the Nigeria experience has completely manifested a threat that if not checked may culminate in the total extinction of Oron people, land and culture.

Be it Resolved and It Is Hereby resolved that in order to save the Oron Nation,

Oron People, Youths and Women all over the world unite under their patriotic organisations; ONAF, OYOM, OPRC, OWAG and others to proclaim the ORO BILL OF RIGHT as the embodiment of the grievances, principles and line of action in irreversible commitment to Oro meaningful survival;
that Oron youths, women and people support and /or initiate any programme anywhere they deem fit for the achievement of the above purpose.
The Bill of Rights of the Oron People
All over the whole civilized world, the flame which provides warmth and beautifies every human society is said to be embedded in the youth who are also its herald of a new dawn and civilisation and to this end, we, the youths and people of Oron drawn from 200 communities of the eleven traditional clans spread across the five Local Government Areas, Oron, Mbo, Udung Uko, Uruko Offong/Oruko and Okobo of Oron Nation met today, the 25th Day of June, 1999 at the civic centre Oron to review the processes of our participation in the Nigerian State, a fate fostered on us by accident of history and respectively preview our match into the third millennium and accordingly State as Follows:

1. That Oron Nation had existed as a free sovereign and egalitarian society for hundreds of years before its coercive lumping into the amalgamated Nigeria in 1914 and is therefore older than Nigeria itself and should have been consulted before the exercise which signalled the beginning of the chastisements hitherto suffered by the Oorn Nation.

2. That before the forcible incorporation of the Oron Nation into the Nigerian State in 1914, the land mass, territorial waters of Oron were larger than what has been arbitrarily determined for it today by the Nigerian State against what was identified in 1690s Dutch maps of old Calabar and Oron Intelligence Report in 1935.

3. That over the years, it has been widely established that the Oro people attach great importance to the creeks and water fronts, but frustratingly, they have continued to have the harrowing experience of having their waters and ocean fronts-their main source of sustenance-gradually seized from them.

The most conspicuous are:

(i) The Stubs and Widenham creeks/forest, water fronts as well as Oro fishing ports dotted along the Atlantic, littoral forceful annexed by Eket division in 1974 through the instrumentality of a Military Governor of Eket extraction, late Jacob Udoakaha Esuene.

(ii) That the Bakassi territorial area on the Oron eastern border with the Cameroon Republic was awarded in 1996 by the Federal Military Government to Cross River State in honour of some highly placed sons and daughters of that state for their closeness to Generals Ibrahim Babangida and Sani Abacha against the position of informed representation, documented facts before and during the colonial/early post-independent era.

4. That the Oron people have never had their dream of belonging to a political configuration of their choice realized as evident in our memoranda to the Irikete Panel on State Creation in 1975, the Political Bureau of 1986-87 and the 1996 Arthur Mbanefo Committee on States, Local Governments Creation and Boundary Adjustment thus showing organized efforts by the Nigerian State to systematically neutralize and Annihilate Oro identity, culture and heritage from the face of the earth.

5. That occasioned by neglect, marginalisation, repression, discrimination and deprivations, the story of Oro participation in the contraption called Nigeria has been one of stagnation and under development.

The following are examples:

(i) No Oron man has ever been appointed or elected a governor of a state and from 1984 till date, none of our sons and daughters has been deemed fit to hold ministerial position in spite of the fact that successive regimes in the country have zoned key positions to Akwa Ibom state.

(ii) No known project has been undertaken by the State and Federal governments within Oro during the period.

6. That although the Oron Nation has played host to oil exploration and exploitation activities which started with Shell in 1958 with capped wells dotted across the Oro landscape, there is nothing to show for it.

7. That despite the presence of Mobil Producing Nigeria Unlimited rigs within Oro territorial waters and in "disputed" waters, the Oron Nation has been denied its due, following the abrogation of offshore - onshore dichotomy as representations for Oro Local Government Areas to be in core catchment area of Mobil Producing Nigeria Unlimited have continued to fall on deaf ears. Of specific note is the fact that even paltry compensations for the January 1998 oil spill have not been paid to most communities and individuals in the Oro speaking Local Government Areas.

8. That our environment has been seriously degraded and abused over the years following indiscriminate activities of oil companies. Most agonising is the continued pollution of our coastal waters, rivers creeks and streams through the dumping of poisonous substances in our deep ocean trenches. Without mincing words, such acts have nonetheless placed our ocean's abundant wealth in jeopardy causing gross impoverishment of many fisherfolk and disrupting lives of coastal habitats and fish nursery grounds. These acts have therefore become very frustrating since right from the beginning of life in this part of Nigeria depends almost wholly on the sea. We live on the sea, die on the sea and as we come to see it today the prospects are dangerously grim and our hopes and security are dimming and worsening by the day. Oro people are encircled by the Nigerian State and its collaborators.

Now exploration activities have driven aquatic products from nearby fishing grounds into the high seas which requires expensive fishing gears such as large boats and outboat engines to enable our fishfolk to continue with their trade. But since then these untold hardships caused us by the multinational oil companies and the Nigerian National Petroleum Company, NNPC no assistance has come from any quarter to cushion the effects of skyrocketing prices of fishing material.

9. That the unilateral determination and implementation of the Derivation Principle of Revenue Allocation by the Federal Government alone without inputs/representations from oil producing States and communities have been a major source of tension in the country. Such a policy has been left to the whims and caprices of the predatory military cliques who were until recently in control of power to the detriment of the oil producing areas.

10. That no positive impact of OMPADEC and Petroleum Trust Fund (PTF), services has been felt in Oro land since their inceptions despite contributions from resources harnessed from Oro land and waters.

11. That the decision of the federal government to address the developmental problems of the Niger Delta through the Niger Delta Development Commission though laudable is not all embracing as it grossly omits some oil producing communities of the Niger Delta and represents palpable acquiescence, until a marginalised community engages the government in fierce battles, it is apparently not disposed to accede to the people's demands.

12. We note with regret that the non-constitution of a governing council for maritime academy of Nigeria, Oro, has given the sole administrator of the institution the licence to run the place like sole proprietorship. This has generated tension in our community. Most of the senior Oro personnel in the institution have been unjustly removed from service. Oro has been denied all benefits that should accrue to the community.

DECLARATION

In view of the above we, representatives of the Oron Nation, comprised in Oron popular organisations, here gathered, to wit

The Oron National Forum (ONAF) The Oron Development Union (ODU) The Oron Youth Movement (OYOM) The Oron Women's Action Group (OWAG) The Oron Revolutionary Youth Committee (ORAYCOM) The Oron Public Relations Committee (OPRC) and other popular, patriotic and democratic organisations

Hereby declare as follows:

1. That the manifest Destiny of the Oron Nation is in the hands of the Oron people, particularly the youth and broad masses.

2. That the achievement of the manifest destiny must be seen in the total security of the Oron geopolitical space which includes the people, the land, the culture and future.

3. That the processes and actions relevant in the achievement of the manifest destiny in no way be compromised by any Oron citizen even at the pains of death.

4. That the Oron Nation is prepared to exist within the Nigerian system if, and only if, the security of the land and people is assured by appropriate affirmative action by the Nigerian Sovereign State by way of a just, equitable and democratic conduct of the affairs of the federal republic of Nigeria through its constitutional, political administration and social policies nationwide and particularly as they affect the micro-minorities.

5. That the Oron Nation unequivocally reject the 1999 constitution of Nigeria on the following grounds:

(a) That it is arbitrary and undemocratic, imposed by a military cabal committed only to sectionalist interests

(b) It woefully fails to address the special interest of the micro-nationalities in the country.

(c) It does not respect and observe genuine federal principles upon which any viable pluralistic Nigerian political community must be built.

(d) It has grave feudalistic elements meant to undermine the small ethnic nationalities and the management of their resources and development interests.

DEMANDS

Fully conscious of the above facts and their implications, the People of Oron demand the following:

(1) All portions of Oron land and adjoining coast, that is, (i) the territory between Oro and the Republic of Cameroun (now called Bakassi) which is part of Mbo local government in Oro and had since been managed under Okolo/Oron Country Council or Oron Local Government. (ii) Esuk Inwang in Okobo Local Government Area settled in favour of Okobo by a competent court of law; (iii) The Stubs and Widenham creek forests with the adjoining coastal waters be immediately returned to the Oron Nation.

(2) The Oron Nation must be made a state within the Niger Delta Region.

(3) That the Federal Republic of Nigeria be restructured in six regions among which the Niger Delta Region comprising Cross River, Akwa Ibom, Rivers, Bayelsa, Delta and Edo States. Each Region logically will be made up of a group of states along geo-cultural lines.

(4) The regions should form the federating units each with the power to manage its affairs particularly development according to its cultural realities.

(5) Every region should control its resources 100% from which it will allocate funds for running the central government.

(6) The Central Government should only handle a small number of policies such as Foreign Affairs, Immigration, Currency, Customs etc.

(7) The control and composition of all security organizations be decentralized, for instance, the military should be controlled and formed on regional commands basis and administered as recommended by the Movement for National Reformation, Izon National Congress, Afenifere, Movement for the Survival of the Ogoni People (MOSOP), the Ohaneze, Uhrobo Union, The Alliance for Democracy, JACON and other patriotic, popular organizations in the country.

(8) The convening of a Sovereign National Conference of Ethnic Nationalities is imperative and should be facilitated by the nationalities to draw up a true democratic, federal structure for Nigeria.

(9) Oron people unequivocally and vigorously reject further existence in the present Akwa Ibom State owing to continuous marginalisation of Oron people by successive administrations all controlled by the majority Ibibio-Annang hegemony. This treatment has manifested in public appointments by the military controlled federal and state appointments as well as the Government of Governor Victor Attah.

(10) Oron nation hereby authorizes its National Joint Committee on Plans and Strategy to take necessary steps towards working with Ibeno and Eastern Obolo (Andoni) ethnic nationalities for a concrete joint programme of self determination of the three peoples.

(11) Oro Nation solicits the cooperation of all peoples and civilised world to come to her aid in securing and advancing her culture and protecting her heritage as a small indegeous nationality.

We, the Representatives of Oron People under the leaderships of the under-listed patriotic popular organisations hereby declare our total and everlasting Commitment to the Bill of Rights of the Oron People as an article of faith. So help us God.

List of Organisations Represented at the Conference on Oron Bill of Rights

1. Oron National Forum (ONAF)
2. Oron Development Union, (ODU)
3. Oron Youth Movement (OYM)
4. Mbo Youth Movement (MYM)
5. Oron Environmental Watch
6. Iguita Progressive Association
7. Oruco Development Association
8. Atak Oro Solidarity Front
9. Nka Mbek oro
10. Udung Uko Improvement Union
11. Uboro Youth Association
12. Oyubia community league
13. Utine Youth Association
14. Oyubia Youth Forum
15. Ebugha Youth Movement
16. Ikpe Oro Youth Forum
17. Oron Women Action Group (OWAG)
18. Oron Development Union, Women's Wing
19. Unyenge Progressive Association
20. Oron Liberation Movement (OLM)
21. Oron Youth Progressives
22. Nka-Ukio Akpakip Oro
23. Udung Uwe Youth Development Association
24. Ukuko Progressive Youth Club
25. Oron Public Relation Committee
26. National Association of Akpakip-Oro students
27. Uya-Oro Youth Association
28. Akwa Ibom Traders Association
29. Eyo-Abasi Youth Association
30. Idua Youth Association

See also
 Andoni people
 Oron people

References 

 Alumni Maritime Academy of Nigeria, Oron. 
 Akwa Ibom State (Isong-ooo!): The unofficial site of Akwa Ibom State, Nigeria. 
 Akwa Ibom State Government, Nigeria. 

Countries in precolonial Africa
Former countries in Africa
African civilizations
History of Nigeria
States and territories established in the 1200s
States and territories disestablished in 1909
Oron people
Calabar
Places in Oron Nation